Celina Leão Hizim Ferreira (born 2 March 1977) is a Brazilian business administrator and politician affiliated with Progressistas (PP), who currently serves as the vice-governor of the Federal District and was the acting governor after the removal of Ibaneis Rocha for 90 days by Supreme Federal Court Justice Alexandre de Moraes. The decision was revoked by Alexandre de Moraes on 15 March 2023.

Leão is former federal deputy and former state deputy, who previously served president of the Legislative Chamber of the Federal District.  

Leão was elected in the first round as vice-governor in 2022, and served only 8 days before assuming the interim governorship.

References 

1977 births
Living people
Governors of the Federal District (Brazil)
Vice Governors of the Federal District (Brazil)
Members of the Legislative Chamber of the Federal District (Brazil)
Progressistas politicians
21st-century Brazilian women politicians
People from Goiânia